The Delaware Township School District is a community public school district that serves students in pre-kindergarten through eighth grade from Delaware Township, in Hunterdon County, New Jersey, United States.

As of the 2018–19 school year, the district, comprised of one school, had an enrollment of 376 students and 42.3 classroom teachers (on an FTE basis), for a student–teacher ratio of 8.9:1.

The district is classified by the New Jersey Department of Education as being in District Factor Group "GH", the third-highest of eight groupings. District Factor Groups organize districts statewide to allow comparison by common socioeconomic characteristics of the local districts. From lowest socioeconomic status to highest, the categories are A, B, CD, DE, FG, GH, I and J.

Students in ninth through twelfth grades attend the Hunterdon Central High School, part of the Hunterdon Central Regional High School District, which serves students in central Hunterdon County from Delaware Township, East Amwell Township, Flemington Borough, Raritan Township and Readington Township. As of the 2018–19 school year, the high school had an enrollment of 2,844 students and 238.8 classroom teachers (on an FTE basis), for a student–teacher ratio of 11.9:1.

Schools
Delaware Township School serves students in grades PreK-8. The school had an enrollment of 373 students as of the 2017–18 school year.

Administration
Core members of the district's administration are:
Dr. Richard Wiener, Superintendent
Susan Joyce, Business Administrator

Board of education
The district's board of education, comprised of nine members, sets policy and oversees the fiscal and educational operation of the district through its administration. As a Type II school district, the board's trustees are elected directly by voters to serve three-year terms of office on a staggered basis, with three seats up for election each year held (since 2012) as part of the November general election. The board appoints a superintendent to oversee the day-to-day operation of the district.

References

External links
Delaware Township School

School Data for the Delaware Township School District, National Center for Education Statistics
Hunterdon Central Regional High School District
Delaware Township School District Schools Enrollment, Test Scores, Events and Contact details at LumosLearning.com

Delaware Township, Hunterdon County, New Jersey
School districts in Hunterdon County, New Jersey
Public K–8 schools in New Jersey